Sito may refer to:
SITO (artist collective)
Sito (footballer, born 1980), real name Luis Castro Rodríguez, Spanish football defender
Sito (footballer, born 1996), real name Andrés Pascual Santoja, Spanish football winger

People with the surname Sito include:
Sugi Sito (1926–2000), Mexican wrestler
Tom Sito (born 1956), American animator

People with the given name or nickname Sito include:
Sito Pons (born 1959), Spanish motorcycle road racer
Sito Alonso (born 1975), Spanish basketball coach
Sito Riera (born 1987), Spanish football forward in Poland
Sito Cruz (born 1988), Spanish football defender
Sito Seoane (born 1989), Spanish football forward in Canada

See also

Seto (disambiguation)
Situ (disambiguation)